Trichoceros is a genus of flowering plants from the orchid family, Orchidaceae. The genus is endemic to South America.

Species
Species accepted as of June 2014:

See also 
 List of Orchidaceae genera

References

External links 

Oncidiinae genera
Orchids of South America
Oncidiinae